Pithoragarh district is the easternmost district in the state of Uttarakhand. The city of Pithoragarh, located in Saur Valley, is its headquarters. The district is within the Kumaon division of Uttarakhand state. The Tibet plateau is situated to the north and Nepal is to the east. The Kali River which originates from the Kalagiri Mountain flows south, forming the eastern border with Nepal. The Hindu pilgrimage route for Mount Kailash-Lake Manasarovar passes through this district via Lipulekh Pass in the greater Himalayas. The district is administratively divided into six Tehsils: Munsyari; Dharchula; Didihat; Berinag; Gangolihat; and Pithoragarh. Naini Saini Airport is the nearest civil airport, but it does not have a regular scheduled commercial passenger service. The mineral deposits present in the district are magnesium ore, copper ore, limestone, and slate. There are 11 tehsils.

Etymology
Some attribute the name to King Prithvi Pal (Had his empire to Nainital & parts of UP) / Piru Gusain (Gusain refers to the younger son of a King), here the younger son of King of Askote (Pal)/ Pithora Shahi/ Pithora Chand from the Chand Dynasty, who built a fort named Pithora Garh in the Saur Valley.

History

Pals (Branch of Katyuri kings)
After its conquest by Bhartpal, the Rajwar of Uku (now in Nepal), in the year 1364, Pithoragarh was ruled for the rest of the 14th century by three generations of Pals, and the kingdom extended from Pithoragarh to Askot.

Bam Dynasty

According to a Tamra Patra (inscribed copper or brass plaque) from 1420, the Pal dynasty, based out of Askot, was uprooted by Chand kings. Vijay Brahm (of the Brahm dynasty from Doti) took over the empire as King. Following the death of Gyan Chand, in a conflict with Kshetra Pal, the Pals were able to regain the throne.

Chand Dynasty
It is believed that Bharti Chand, an ancestor of Gyan Chand, had replaced Bams, the ruler of Pithoragarh, after defeating them in 1445. In the 16th century, the Chand dynasty again took control over Pithoragarh town and, in 1790, built a new fort on the hill where the present Girls Inter College is situated.
The Chand rule, at its zenith, is seen as one of the most prominent empires in Kumaon. Their rule also coincides with a period of cultural resurgence. Archaeological surveys point toward the development of culture and art forms in this period.

Modern history
British rule began on 2 December 1815 when Nepal was forced to sign the Sugauli Treaty. Pithoragarh remained a tehsil under Almora district until 1960 when its status was elevated to that of a district. There was an army cantonment, a church, and a mission school, resulting in the spread of Christianity in the region. 

The Bhotiya communities living in the Pithoragarh district historically practised transhumance between summer villages located at higher altitudes, close to the border with Tibet, and winter settlements located at lower altitudes, close to the Himalayan foothills and the Gangetic plains. With transhumance as a base, many of them would engage in annual trade visits to market towns such as Taklakot in western Tibet, and some would practice nomadic pastoralism as well. This way of life came to an abrupt end in the 1962 due to the Sino-Indian War. Trans-Himalayan trade was allowed again since the under 1990s. But unlike in the past, it was now to be conducted under state-imposed regulations and limitations, and was allowed only across the Pithoragarh district's Lipu Lekh pass, whereas in earlier times, in Kumaon and Garwhal, the Trans-Himalayan trade had been conducted across several passes. 

In 1997, part of the Pithoragarh district was cut out to form the new Champawat district.

Demographics

According to the 2011 census Pithoragarh district has a population of 483,439, roughly equal to the nation of Suriname. This gives it a ranking of 546th among the 640 Districts of India. Its population growth rate over the decade 2001–2011 was 5.13%. Pithoragarh has a sex ratio of 1021 females for every 1000 males, and a literacy rate of 82.93%. Scheduled Castes and Scheduled Tribes make up 24.90% and 4.04% of the population respectively.

Native tribes in the district include the Van Rawats and Shaukas. Van Rawats are hunter-gatherers. Shaukas are traders. In Pithoragarh  the Shaukas are divided into two main tribes. Johari Shaukas and Rung Shaukas. The Johari Shauka community inhabits the areas in Munsiyari while Rung Shaukas tribe are spread among the three valleys of Darma, Chaundas, and Byans. Kangdali Festival, celebrated once every 12 years by inhabitants of Chaundas Valley, is one of the major festivals in this area.

Languages 

Kumaoni, with its several dialects, is the most widely spoken language. Hindi is the common language between the locals and outsiders, and English is spoken by some people, especially teachers, lecturers, and students in tertiary education.

Several Sino-Tibetan languages of the West Himalayish branch are spoken by small communities. These include the three closely related languages of Byangsi, Chaudangsi, and Darmiya, as well as Rangkas & Rawat. The Van Rawat tribe speaks their own variety of Kumaoni.

Assembly Constituencies
Dharchhula 
Didihat 
Pithoragarh 
Gangolihat (SC)

Climate
Pithoragarh town, being in a valley, is relatively warm during summer and cool during winter. Pithoragarh district has extreme variation in temperature due to the wide range of variations in altitude. The temperature rises from mid-March through mid-June. The areas above  remain in a permanent snow cover. Regions lying at  become snowbound for four to six months. At places like the river gorges at Dharchula, Jhulaghat, Ghat and Sera, temperatures reach . After June the district receives monsoon showers. Winter is a time for transhumance – the seasonal migration of the Bhotiya tribe with their herds of livestock to lower, warmer areas.

Seasons
Winter (cold weather): December–March
Summer (hot weather): March–June
Season of general rains: North–West monsoon – mid-June to mid-September
Season of retreating monsoon: September–November

Glaciers of Pithoragarh
Locally, glaciers are known as Gal. Some important glaciers of the district are as follows:
 Milam Glacier
 Namik Glacier
 Ralam Glacier
 Meola Glacier
 Sona Glacier
 Panchchuli Glacier
 Balati Glacier
 Shipu Glacier
 Rula Glacier
 Kalabaland Glacier
 Lawan Glacier
 Northern Lwanl
 Middle Lwanl
 Lower Lwanl
 Bamlas Glacier
 Baldimga Glacier
 Terahar Glacier
 Poting Glacier
 Talkot Glacier
 Sankalpa Glacier
 Lassar Glacier
 Upper Lassar
 Lower Lassar
 Middle Lassar
 Dhauli Glacier
 Baling Golfu Glacier
 Dhauli Glacier
 Sobla Tejam Glacier
 Kali Glacier
 Kuti Glacier
 Yangti Basin Glacier
 Lower Dhauli
 Middle Dhauli
 Upper Dhauli
 Lower Kali
 Upper Kali

Himalayan peaks of Pithoragarh

Mountain passes of Pithoragarh

International passes to Tibet

Intra-district Himalayan passes

Valleys of Pithoragarh
 Vyas valley (includes Kuthi Valley and the valley of Kalapani River)
 Kuti-Yangti Valley : Kuti-Yangti valley has 112 glaciers. The passes of Kuti valley Lampiya Dhura (5,553 m), Nuwe Dhura (5,650 m)
 Chaudans valley
 Darma Valley
 Goriganga valley : Goriganga has 128 glaciers with largest Milam glacier having 18 km in length.
 Dhauliganga valley : Those are source of several streams and rivers. Maximum 135 glaciers found in the Dhauliganga valley.
 Johar Valley
 Kalabaland valley
 Kali valley : Lipu Lekh Pass (5,122 m) (India, Tibet, Nepal)
 Lassar Yangti valley
 Ralam valley
 Saur valley
 Ramganga valley :There are 7 glaciers in Ramganga valley and Namik is largest with 2.4 square Km in size.
 Saryu /Sarju Valley
 Gori Gunkha valley : Belcha Dhura pass (5,384 m), Kungri Bhingri Pass (5,564 m), Keo Dhura pass (5,439 m)

Flora
A wide variety of flora exists in the district, including many unique sub-tropical, temperate, and alpine plants. Bryophytes (mosses), pteridophytes (ferns), gymnosperms (conifers), and angiosperms (flowering plants) are present. Rare varieties of orchids are also present in the high-altitude valleys of Milan, Darma, Beyans, and Kuthi. Species present include:

 Abies pindrow
 Aconitum heterophyllum
 Berberis aristata (Kirmod)
 Betula utilis (Himalayan birch or Bhoj Patra)
 Cedrus deodara (Deodar Cedar)
 Cypripedium cordigerum
 Dendrobium normale
 Myrica esculenta (Kafal)
 Nardostachys grandiflora (Jatmasi)
 Pedicularis punctata
 Picrorhiza kurroa (Kutki)
 Pinus roxburghii (Salla or Chir)
 Pinus wallichiana (Blue Pine or Raisalla)
 Prunus cornuta
 Prunus puddum
 Quercus dilatata
 Quercus incana
 Quercus leucotricophora (Banjh)
 Quercus semicarpifolia
 Rhododendron barbatum (Burans)
 Rhododendron campanulatum
 Rubus ellipticus (Hisalu)
 Saussurea obvallata (Brahm Kamal)
 Saussurea simpsonia
 Taxus wallichiana (Himalayan yew)
 Vanda cristata
 Zanthoxylum armatum (Timur)
 10–15 kinds of cactus
 Aadu
 Different type of pulses like red and green lentils
 Figs
 Green apples
 Himalyan pears
 Mulberry
 Oranges
 Peaches
 Red apples
 Rye (a local staple)
 Simal
 Soy beans
 Yellow plums

Tourist attractions

 Askot Musk Deer Sanctuary is a 599.93 km2 wildlife sanctuary located around Askot near Didihat, in Pithoragarh district of the Himalaya of Kumaon in Uttarakhand, India.

 Berinag is a hill station located 102 km from Pithoragarh at an altitude of 2010 m. 
 Chaukori is a hill station located 10 km from Berinag, also with an altitude of 2010 m.

 Munsyari is a hill station in the northern part of the Pithoragarh district. The valley from Munsyari to Milam is known as Johar Valley.

 Pithoragarh Fort is set atop a hill on the outskirts of the town and now serves as a museum.
 Mostamanu Temple is a hindu temple dedicated to Mosta, an avatar of Lord Shiva.

See also 
 Kumaoni people
 Kumaon Regiment
 Shauka - Johar
 Chand Kings
 Rung Community

References

External links
 

 
Districts of Uttarakhand
Hill stations in Uttarakhand
Tourism in Uttarakhand